Libe Alexandra Barer (born December 19, 1991) is an American actress, best known for playing the role of Carly Bowman in the Amazon Prime original series Sneaky Pete.

Early life
Barer was born in Los Angeles. Her younger sibling is Ariela Barer. Their parents are both Mexican-born and Jewish.

Barer attended the Los Angeles County High School for the Arts (nicknamed "Fame High") where she received an LACHSA Moondance Film Festival Award for her screenplay "On Top Of The World."

Career
In addition to her role on Sneaky Pete, Barer starred in the short film Disfluency, had a role on the shows Those Who Can't and Parenthood, and was featured in a commercial for Subway.

Filmography

References

External links

1991 births
21st-century American actresses
Living people
American actresses of Mexican descent
American people of Mexican-Jewish descent
Jewish American actresses
Hispanic and Latino American people
21st-century American Jews